The 177th Massachusetts General Court, consisting of the Massachusetts Senate and the Massachusetts House of Representatives, met in 1991 and 1992 during the governorship of Bill Weld. William Bulger served as president of the Senate and Charles Flaherty served as speaker of the House.

Significant legislation included an act allowing school choice.

Senators

Representatives

See also
 1990 Massachusetts general election
 102nd United States Congress
 List of Massachusetts General Courts

References

Further reading
 
  (describes advocacy by Mothers Against Drunk Driving)

External links

 
 
 
 
 
 
  (1964-1994)

Political history of Massachusetts
Massachusetts legislative sessions
massachusetts
1991 in Massachusetts
massachusetts
1992 in Massachusetts